In mathematics, Frullani integrals are a specific type of improper integral named after the Italian mathematician Giuliano Frullani. The integrals are of the form

The following formula for their general solution holds under certain conditions:

Proof 

A simple proof of the formula can be arrived at by using the Fundamental theorem of calculus to express the integrand as an integral of :

and then use  Tonelli’s theorem to interchange the two integrals:

Note that the integral in the second line above has been taken over the interval , not .

Applications 
The formula can be used to derive an integral representation for the natural logarithm  by letting  and :

The formula can also be generalized in several different ways.

References 
 G. Boros, Victor Hugo Moll, Irresistible Integrals (2004), pp. 98
 Juan Arias-de-Reyna, On the Theorem of Frullani (PDF; 884 kB), Proc. A.M.S. 109 (1990), 165-175.
 ProofWiki, proof of Frullani's integral.

Integrals